Hall is a hamlet (and census-designated place) in Ontario County, New York, United States, near the city of Geneva, along State Route 14A in the Town of Seneca.

Located in the Finger Lakes region, Hall has a fire department and a post office with a downtown zip code of 14463, though the urbanized area extends beyond this. Hall also has various agricultural enterprises, including a John Deere tractor dealer, a seed production company (Seedway), and a fertilizer company (Hall Fertilizer Corp.). Seedway, a subsidiary of Growmark, serves the entire Northeast and is headquartered in Hall.

As of the 2010 census, Hall has a population of 216. With the exception of one Korean, the population was fully non-Hispanic white. Of the 97 housing units in the hamlet, 12 were vacant and the median household income was $74,861, reflective of its relatively robust economy. None of the population was below the poverty line.

Hall and the surrounding area were settled and cleared, mostly as farmland, around the turn of the 19th century, with a wave of migration from England. The hamlet, which was originally established as Hall's Corners, was informally known as "the English settlement." Starting in the mid-19th century, Hall had a station on a since removed section of line of the now defunct Elmira Rail Road Company, a subsidiary of the Northern Central Railroad. Despite this, Hall has retained its status as an active agricultural center.

Hall's agricultural economy is supported by two companies, Seedway and LandPro. The latter is a large John Deere dealership with over 20 locations in New York, Ohio and Pennsylvania.

References

External links

Hamlets in New York (state)
Census-designated places in Ontario County, New York
Census-designated places in New York (state)
Hamlets in Ontario County, New York